Thomas James O'Leary (born June 21, 1956) is an American film, television, and theatre actor.

Career 
O'Leary began his acting career on the theater stage in New York, broadening to Broadway theaters, and finally to film and television.

He played the Phantom in the Third National Touring production of Andrew Lloyd Webber's The Phantom of the Opera for over a year, and on Broadway from late 1996 to January 1999. He was chosen by Harold Prince to perform the title role for the 10th anniversary celebration in 1998.

Personal life 
O'Leary lives in Los Angeles.

Filmography

Film

Television

External links
 Official site
 
 

1956 births
American male stage actors
Living people